Hornindalsvatnet is Norway's and Europe's deepest lake, and the world's twelfth deepest lake, officially measured to a depth of .

The village of Grodås lies at the eastern end of the lake in Volda Municipality in Møre og Romsdal county and the village of Mogrenda is located on the western end of the lake in Stad Municipality in Vestland county. The European route E39 highway runs near the lake. The village of Heggjabygda and Heggjabygda Church lie on the northern shore of the lake.

The main outflow is the river Eidselva, which flows into the Eidsfjorden, an arm off the main Nordfjorden.

The deepest point of the lake was explored using a ROV in 2006. A small white fish was discovered on the lake bottom – probably a new species of Arctic charr (Salvelinus alpinus). It was previously also located in Lake Tinn, Norway's third deepest lake.

The lake is also the site of the Hornindalsvatnet Marathon, held annually in July.

See also
List of lakes of Norway

References

External links

Lakes of Vestland
Lakes of Møre og Romsdal
Stad, Norway
Volda